Novoshakhtinsky is an urban locality (an urban-type settlement) in Mikhaylovsky District of Primorsky Krai, Russia. Population: . The Trans-Siberian railroad passes through the town.

History
Urban-type settlement status was granted to Novoshakhtinsky in 1967.

Economy
Coal-mining forms the basis of the settlement's economy.  After the Global Financial Crisis of 2007 and 2008 when primary products, raw materials, and such like, on the world market decreased in value, coal also suffered.  There was a decrease in demand and price.  Being a "one horse" town, this economic reality hit hard on the mine and the population.  In addition, there is also the "bright lights" of Vladivostok, and of course, Moscow and St Petersburg, so those young individuals with transferable skills move out of the town.  

However, there is significant potential in this town, and the region.  It is close to a major city (Vladivostok) and the growing economies of Asia such as China and South Korea.  It has good housing, roads, schools, while in need of upgrade, it is in place and ready to advance.

Miscellaneous
There is a music school and an orphanage in Novoshakhtinsky.

References

Urban-type settlements in Primorsky Krai